Olusegun Osaniyi (born July 16, 1982) who is known by his stage name "Lord of Ajasa" or ''Alariwo of Africa'' is a Nigerian rapper and the CEO of Apashe Records. He is a native of Akure, Ondo State. He was given the name "the Lord of Flavor" (Ajasa is Yoruba term for flavor) in his polytechnic days in Ondo state, where he majored in Quantity Survey. He raps primarily in Yoruba Language.“Ma yi lo” was his first track which made him popular and it came out in 2000.” In the beginning of his career, he collaborated with 9ice,Olamide, and the late Dagrin, among other Nigerian singers.

Due to his health challenge,which was diagnosed of peptic ulcer, he left the music industry with the claim he was into other businesses which required time to stabilize.

List of songs 

 Ma yi lo 
 Le Fenugreek So
 Oti Ya
 Ara Awe
 Lacasera
 Who Be Dat
 Halelluya
 Bi Ere
 Omo Igboro
 Omo PIshaun
 Tete Wa
 I Dey 4 Party
 Ojumo Re
 Aye Mon
 Lori Ila
 Figure 8
 Democrazy 
 Ki Lo Mo
 Ijala
 The Spirit 
 See drama
 Eso lo bade
 Kelegbe
 New Era
 Anyhow

Health challenge 
In 2019, he was said to be in urgent need of funds to undergo a peptic ulcer operation.

References 

Nigerian male rappers
Nigerian songwriters
Nigerian pop singers
1982 births
Living people
Nigerian male musicians
Yoruba musicians
People from Zaria
Nigerian hip hop singers
21st-century Nigerian musicians
Nigerian music industry executives
English-language singers from Nigeria
Yoruba-language singers
Yoruba businesspeople